Nuclear density is the density of the nucleus of an atom. For heavy nuclei, it is close to the nuclear saturation density  nucleons/fm3, which minimizes the energy density of an infinite nuclear matter. The nuclear saturation mass density is thus  kg/m3, where mu is the atomic mass constant. The descriptive term nuclear density is also applied to situations where similarly high densities occur, such as within neutron stars.

Evaluation 
The nuclear density of a typical nucleus can be approximately calculated from the size of the nucleus, which itself can be approximated based on the number of protons and neutrons in it. The radius of a typical nucleus, in terms of number of nucleons, is

The number density of the nucleus is thus:

The density for any typical nucleus, in terms of mass number, is thus constant, not dependent on A or R, theoretically:

The experimentally determined value for the nuclear saturation density is 

The mass density ρ is the product of the number density n by the particle's mass. The calculated mass density, using a nucleon mass of mn=1.67×10−27 kg, is thus:

 (using the theoretical estimate) 

or 

  (using the experimental value).

Applications and extensions 
The components of an atom and of a nucleus have varying densities. The proton is not a fundamental particle, being composed of quark–gluon matter. Its size is approximately 10−15 meters and its density 1018 kg/m3. The descriptive term nuclear density is also applied to situations where similarly high densities occur, such as within neutron stars.

Using deep inelastic scattering, it has been estimated that the "size" of an electron, if it is not a point particle, must be less than 10−17 meters. This would correspond to a density of roughly 1021 kg/m3.

There are possibilities for still-higher densities when it comes to quark matter. In the near future, the highest experimentally measurable densities will likely be limited to leptons and quarks.

See also
Electron degeneracy pressure
Nuclear matter
Quark–gluon plasma

References

External links
 (derivation of equations and other mathematical descriptions)

Density